Rubin "Rubie" Schron is a New York City real estate investor, landlord, and the founder of Cammeby's International Group. He owns or controls property worth over $13 billion, according to data company Real Capital Analytics. Founded in 1967, Cammeby's portfolio includes office buildings; market-rate and government-subsidized apartment complexes; nursing homes, the 16-building complex in Sunset Park now known as Industry City; a stake in the bottom half of the Woolworth Building; and industrial properties across Long Island. In 2013, Schron made an unsolicited and unsuccessful offer to buy the Empire State Building for $2 billion. In 2003, an investment group led by Schron paid $705.6 million for a portfolio of about 6,000 outer-borough apartments from Donald Trump. Other buildings he owns include the Monterey, a 521-unit rental multifamily building on Manhattan's Upper East Side; over the decades, Schron has also amassed a portfolio of Mitchell-Lama apartment buildings whose values have been skyrocketing to record values, after reverting to market rates when government subsidies expired. In 2007, he sold nearly 4,000 units of former Mitchell-Lama properties in five complexes in Harlem and on Roosevelt Island for $940 million. Schron, who practices Orthodox Judaism, has eight children and 50 grandchildren. He and his family reside in Brooklyn.

Early life
Schron grew up on the Lower East Side of Manhattan in an Orthodox Jewish family. His family entered the real estate business by using the proceeds from the death of his brother in World War II to purchase a small apartment building.

Career
Schron continued with the family business purchasing several buildings in the Bronx. In 1967, he founded the real estate investment company Cammeby's International Group. Typically partnering in all his transactions, Schron steadily grew the business. In 2007, Cammeby's was managing over $1 billion in assets.
Rubin Schron partners with Avrohom Fruchthandler president of FBE Limited on most of his large real estate deals.

Significant transactions include:
In 1998, he and partner Steve Witkoff purchased the Woolworth Building for $137.5 million. 
In 2003, he purchased 6,000 outer borough apartments from the estate of Fred Trump. 
In 2007, he sold 4,000 Mitchell-Lama apartments for $940 million to Urban American Management and its private equity partner, City Investment Fund.  
In 2011, he sold the Lionel Hampton Houses in Harlem to real estate investor Israel Weinberger for $32.5 million. 
In 2013, he made an unsuccessful bid for the Empire State Building.
In 2013, he purchased the Monterey, a 521 unit apartment tower, for $250 million from The Related Companies.

Nursing home investments
In 2002, Schron was advised by his friend and attorney, Leonard Grunstein, to purchase two large nursing home chains with over 18,000 patients and 183 facilities spread out over 27 states for a combined $1.4 billion. In 2003, the bankrupt Integrated Health Services (renamed SavaSeniorCare) was purchased and in 2004, Mariner Health Care was purchased. Schron financed the entire transaction.  They split each company into two entities: a real estate company which would hold the real property (run by Schron); and an operating company that would run the nursing homes (run by Grunstein and a banker named Murray Foreman). The operating company would make lease payments to the real estate company. The partnership deteriorated after Schron was told by Grunstein that he could not raise rent payments even while interest rates were rising.  A lawsuit resulted and Schron countersued to exercise a $100 million option to purchase the nursing home side of the business. Schron, represented by attorney Andrew J. Levander, prevailed and in 2012, he took full control of the two nursing home companies with a combined $1.4 billion in revenues.

Personal life
Schron is widowed having lost his wife Marta in June 2020. They had eight children together. He lives in Brooklyn in the same single-family home where he raised his family. He leads a simple life and eschews interviews.

2022 Bronx fire tragedy
Through Cammeby's International, Schron was the owner of 333 E. 181st St. In 2019 Schon sold it to Bronx Park Phase III Preservation LLC, a partnership among Rick Gropper of Camber Property Group, Belveron Partners and LIHC Investment Group.  On January 9, 2022, almost 20 people died in a fire with dozens injured. Initially, the five-alarm blaze originated with a space heater in one of the apartments. However, some of the self-closing doors were malfunctioning and contributed to the deaths and injuries, even though Schons group had received $25 million in 2014 and Gropper's Bronx Park Phase III partnership received $11 million for repairs and upgrades, for over two dozen complaints and violations.

Both Schon and Cammeby's as well as the new owners,Bronx Park Phase III Preservation LLC, have been sued in a Class Action lawsuit seeking $1 billion in compensatory damages for alleged negligence and another $2 billion in punitive damages on behalf of themselves and “all others similarly situated."

References

1939 births
American real estate businesspeople
American Orthodox Jews
Businesspeople from New York City
People from Brooklyn
Living people
American billionaires
People from the Lower East Side
American landlords